Beurla Reagaird (previously also spelled Beurla Reagair) is a nearly extinct, Scottish Gaelic-based cant used by the indigenous travelling community of the Highlands of Scotland, formerly often referred to by the disparaging name "tinkers".

Name
 loosely translates as "speech of metalworkers" in reference to their traditional occupation of being traveling blacksmiths. Although Beurla today refers to the English language, its original meaning is that of "jargon" (from Old Irish , bél "mouth" plus the abstract forming suffix -re), with the second element being linked to the word eagar "order, array, arrangement" (cf. the Irish Béarla na Saor "speech of the smiths").

See also
 Bungee language
 Scottish Cant

References

Scottish Travellers
Cant languages
Scottish Gaelic dialects
Mixed languages